Football club de Nancy was a French association football team playing in the city of Nancy, Meurthe-et-Moselle. The team was founded in 1901 and dissolved in 1968.

Honours
 Coupe de France finalist in 1953, 1962
 Division 2 in 1946 (North group), 1958

Players

Managerial history

References

External links
 History

 
Association football clubs established in 1901
Association football clubs disestablished in 1968
FC Nancy
1901 establishments in France
1968 disestablishments in France
Nancy FC
Football clubs in Grand Est
Ligue 1 clubs